Big Salmon Creek may refer to the following streams in the United States:

 Big Salmon Creek (California), stream in Mendocino County, California
 Big Salmon Creek (Montana), stream in Flathead County, Montana
 Big Salmon Creek (New York), stream in Cayuga County, New York